So They Say is an American rock band based in St. Louis, Missouri, United States. They released their self-titled debut EP in 2005. Shortly after, in 2006, they released their debut studio album, Antidote for Irony on Fearless Records. They recorded the follow-up album, Life In Surveillance with Matt Hyde (Strung Out, Slayer, Liars Inc., Porno for Pyros), released on October 9, 2007. So They Say appeared on Warped Tour 2007, 2006 and one week on Warped Tour 2005. In April 2008 the band decided to take some time off to pursue other musical tastes. Justin Hanson is currently playing drums in the band 3TEETH, Nicholas Walters is currently working in the music industry. David and Joseph went on to play in a band called Me Verse You. In late 2010, David and Joseph put out a statement saying: "After taking some time off to clear our heads, and pursue various musical projects, Dave and I have realized when we were listening to our newest batch of demos that it was So They Say." The band then added Cory Laneman on drums, and Alex Wilkinson on lead guitar.

Band members
 David Schroeder: rhythm guitar, vocals (2005–2010, 2010–present)
 Joseph Hamilton: bass (2010–present), lead vocals (2005–present)
 Alex Wilkinson: lead guitar (2008–present)
 Cory Laneman: drums (2008–present)

Former members:
 Mike Guffey: guitar (2005–2009)
 Nicholas Walters: lead guitar (2005-2008)
 Justin Hanson: drums, percussion (2005–2008)
 Joe Hoermann: bass (2006–2010)
 Chris Dickey: bass (2005–2006)

Discography

So They Say (2005)
Antidote for Irony (2006)
Life in Surveillance (2007)
"Untitled E.P." (2011)

References

External links

Musical groups established in 2005
Fearless Records artists
Alternative rock groups from Missouri
Musical groups from St. Louis